Cheb is a 1991 Algerian-French drama film directed by Rachid Bouchareb. The film was selected as the Algerian entry for the Best Foreign Language Film at the 64th Academy Awards, but was not accepted as a nominee.

Cast
 Mourad Bounaas as Merwan
 Nozha Khouadra as Malika
 Pierre-Loup Rajot as Ceccaldi
 Boualem Benani as Le capitaine
 Fawzi B. Saichi as Garçon du hammam
 Mohamed Nacef as L'adjudant
 Nadji Beida as Miloud

See also
 List of submissions to the 64th Academy Awards for Best Foreign Language Film
 List of Algerian submissions for the Academy Award for Best Foreign Language Film

References

External links
 

1991 films
1991 drama films
French drama films
1990s Arabic-language films
1990s French-language films
Films directed by Rachid Bouchareb
Georges Delerue Award winners
Algerian drama films
1991 multilingual films
Algerian multilingual films
French multilingual films
1990s French films